The following radio stations broadcast on AM frequency 666 kHz:

Australia
2CN at Canberra, A.C.T.
4CC at Biloela, Queensland
4LM at Mount Isa
6LN at Carnarvon, Western Australia

Iran
IRIB Fars from several sites

Japan
JOBK at Osaka

Philippines

Portugal
Antena 1 from several sites

Spain
EAJ-1 at Barcelona

Vietnam
VOV1 at Nha Trang

Lists of radio stations by frequency

References